Marsdenia is a genus of plants in the family Apocynaceae first described as a genus in 1810. It is named in honor of the plant collector and Secretary of the Admiralty, William Marsden. The plants are native to tropical regions in Asia, Africa, Australia, and the Americas.

Species

formerly included
transferred to other genera (Anisopus, Blepharodon, Cionura, Cynanchum, Dischidanthus, Dischidiopsis, Dittoceras, Dregea, Gongronema, Gymnema, Jasminanthes, Leichardtia, Lygisma, Matelea, Metalepis, Pergularia, Sarcolobus, Secamonopsis, Sinomenium, Stephanotis, Stigmatorhynchus, Vincetoxicum, Wattakaka)

References

 
Apocynaceae genera
Taxonomy articles created by Polbot